Dexia rustica is a species of fly in the family Tachinidae.

Distribution and habitat
This species can be found in most of Europe. These tachinids usually inhabit hedge rows and flowery environments.

Description

These small tachinids have generally a black thorax, with grayish yellow pruinosity. Four longitudinal black vittae appear on dorsum, Abdomen appears greyish-brown or reddish, with a darker longitudinal dorsal marking, more or less evident. It is cylindric-conic, with two setae among each segment. Probocis is short and membranous. Females usually are darker than males.
Wings are hyaline, with a reddish yellow tegula and a dark brown basicosta. Legs are reddish yellow.

Biology
Adults can be found from June to August, feeding on nectar and pollen, especially of Heracleum sphondylium.

Larvae develop in the soil feeding on beetle larvae (endoparasitism), mainly of Melolontha melolontha, Amphimallon solstitialis, Rhizotrogus marginipes and Phyllopertha horticola (Scarabaeidae).

References

Diptera of Europe
Dexiinae
Insects described in 1775
Taxa named by Johan Christian Fabricius